Solero is an ice cream brand, sold under the Heartbrand name in several countries, owned by Unilever and first launched in 1994. In some countries, including Iran, it is sold under the brand name Salar.

See also
 List of ice cream brands

References

Ice cream brands
Unilever brands